The Women's 100 metres hurdles at the 2014 Commonwealth Games, as part of the athletics programme, took place at Hampden Park on 31 July and 1 August 2014. Sally Pearson of Australia won the gold medal.

Records

Heats

Heat 1

Heat 2

Heat 3

Final

References

Women's 100 metres hurdles
2014
2014 in women's athletics